Vagabond Ways is the 15th studio album by British singer Marianne Faithfull. This is her first album of original material since A Secret Life (1994). This work, produced by Daniel Lanois and Mark Howard, is a balladry-like extension of her then neo-cabaret persona, interpreting songs by herself and legendary songwriters of her generation, like Pink Floyd's Roger Waters, Leonard Cohen and the songwriting duo Elton John and Bernie Taupin. Many of the stories told on this album were adapted from memories that didn't make her autobiography or her observations of social struggles by which she felt particularly moved.

"Incarceration of a Flower Child" was written by Roger Waters in 1968, and has never been recorded in any format by Pink Floyd. The lyrics seem to be about the downfall of former Floyd member Syd Barrett, but Waters has never confirmed this.

A Deluxe Edition was released in 2022 by BMG Rights Management.

Track listing
 "Vagabond Ways" (Marianne Faithfull, David Courts) – 3:22
 "Incarceration of a Flower Child" (Roger Waters) – 5:34
 "File It Under Fun from the Past" (Marianne Faithfull, Barry Reynolds) – 4:50
 "Electra" (Marianne Faithfull, Barry Reynolds, Frank McGuinness) – 3:24
 "Wilder Shores of Love" (Marianne Faithfull, Barry Reynolds, Guy Pratt) – 5:40
 "Marathon Kiss" (Daniel Lanois) – 4:00
 "For Wanting You" (Elton John, Bernie Taupin) – 3:57
 "Great Expectations" (Marianne Faithfull, Daniel Lanois) – 3:13
 "Tower of Song" (Leonard Cohen) – 4:35
 "After the Ceasefire" (Daniel Lanois, Frank McGuinness) – 4:22

Bonus track (Japan edition)
 "Blood in My Eyes" (Bob Dylan) - 4:07

2022 deluxe edition extra tracks
 "Blood in My Eyes" (bonus track)
 "Drifting" (previously unreleased)
 "Vagabond Ways" (Demo) (previously unreleased)
 "Incarceration of a Flower Child" (Demo) (previously unreleased)
 "Electra" (Demo) (previously unreleased)
 "Tower of Song" (Demo) (previously unreleased)

Personnel
Marianne Faithfull - vocals
Daniel Lanois - producer, guitar, bass, drums, percussion, loops
Mark Howard - producer, keyboards, organ, percussion, loops, mixing
Barry Reynolds - guitar, slide guitar, bass, piano
Roger Waters - bass, keyboards
Brian Blade - drums, percussion
Michael Chaves - guitar
Danny Frankel - drums, percussion
Emmylou Harris - background vocals
Victor Indrizzo - guitar
Novi Novog - viola
Glenn Patscha - keyboards, piano, bass pedals, string arrangements
Christopher Thomas - bass, fuzz bass, double bass
Stephanie File - cello
Daryl Johnson - backing vocals
Technical
Daniel Lanois - original production on "Marathon Kiss"
Simon Francis - engineer
Zack Allentuck - engineer
Ellen von Unwerth - photography

References

1999 albums
Marianne Faithfull albums
Albums produced by Daniel Lanois